This is a list of the main career statistics of former tennis player Andre Agassi.

Finals

Grand Slam finals

Singles: 15 (8 titles, 7 runner-ups)
By winning the 1999 French Open, Agassi completed a men's singles Career Grand Slam. He is the 5th of 8 male players in history (after Budge, Perry, Laver, Emerson and before Rafael Nadal, Roger Federer, and Novak Djokovic) to achieve this.

Year-end championships finals

Singles: 4 (1 title, 3 runner-ups)

Grand Slam Cup

Singles: 1 (1 runner-up)

ATP Masters Series finals (since 1990)

Singles: 22 (17 titles, 5 runner-ups)
Agassi won 17 Masters Series singles titles, which is currently the fourth highest of all-time, behind Novak Djokovic , Rafael Nadal and Roger Federer.  It is also the overall sixth highest total of 'tier one' titles (including those which preceded Masters 1000 events, such as the Super Nine) behind Novak Djokovic (36), Rafael Nadal (36) and Roger Federer (28).

Olympic finals

Singles: 1 (1 gold medal)

Career finals

Singles: 90 (60 titles, 30 runner-ups)

Doubles: 4 (1 title, 3 runner-ups)

Team competition: 3 (2 titles, 1 runner-up)

Career ITF  and exhibition finals

Singles

Wins (11)

Losses (3)

Singles performance timeline

Note: Tournaments were designated as the 'Masters Series' only after the ATP took over the running of the men's tour in 1990.

1This event was held in Stockholm through 1994, Essen in 1995, and Stuttgart from 1996 through 2001.

ATP Tour career earnings

 * As of September 18, 2006.

Career Grand Slam tournament seedings 

The tournaments won by Agassi are in boldface.

Record against top players

Agassi's win–loss record against top opponents is as follows:

 Michael Chang 15–7
 Pete Sampras 14–20
 Todd Martin 13–5
 Wayne Ferreira 11–0
 Jan-Michael Gambill 11–2
 Boris Becker 10–4
 Patrick Rafter 10–5
 Greg Rusedski 9–2
 Yevgeny Kafelnikov 8–4
 Jeff Tarango 7–0
 Petr Korda 7–1
 Sergi Bruguera 7–2
 Gustavo Kuerten 7–4
 Michael Stich 6–0
 Todd Woodbridge 6–0
 Nicolas Kiefer 6–0
 Sargis Sargsian 6–0
 Xavier Malisse 6–0
 Thomas Johansson 6–1
 Jan Siemerink 6–1
 Mark Philippoussis 6–2
 MaliVai Washington 6–2
 Stefan Edberg 6–3
 David Wheaton 6–3
 Tommy Haas 6–4
 Taylor Dent 5–0
 Younes El Aynaoui 5–0
 Jonas Björkman 5–0
 Andy Roddick 5–1
 Jason Stoltenberg 5–1
 Nicolas Escudé 5–1
 Jiri Novak 5–1
 Guillermo Coria 5–2
 Mats Wilander 5–2
 Aaron Krickstein 5–3
 Alex Corretja 5–3
 Thomas Muster 5–4
 Thomas Enqvist 5–5
 Jim Courier 5–7
 Goran Prpic 4–0
 Davide Sanguinetti 4–0
 Robby Ginepri 4–0
 Mikael Pernfors 4–1
 Alberto Berasategui 4–1
 James Blake 4–1
 Emilio Sanchez 4–1
 Rainer Schüttler 4–1
 Albert Costa 4–1
 Jim Grabb 4–1
 Gastón Gaudio 4–1
 Vincent Spadea 4–2
 Marc Rosset 4–2
 Arnaud Clement 4–2
 Mark Woodforde 4–2
 Francisco Clavet 4–2
 Richard Krajicek 4–3
 Sebastian Grosjean 4–3
 Goran Ivanisevic 4–3
 Lleyton Hewitt 4–4
 Brad Gilbert 4–4
 Paul Annacone 3–0
 Cedric Pioline 3–0
 Paul-Henri Mathieu 3–0
 Kenneth Carlsen 3–0
 Todd Witsken 3–0
 Mariano Zabaleta 3–0
 Guy Forget 3–0
 Magnus Larsson 3–1
 Carlos Moya 3–1
 Justin Gimelstob 3–1
 Magnus Norman 3–1
 Jakob Hlasek 3–2
 Dominik Hrbaty 3–2
 Magnus Gustafsson 3–3
 Fabrice Santoro 3–3
 Marat Safin 3–3
 Karol Kucera 3–4
 Roger Federer 3–8
 Wally Masur 2–0
 Tomas Berdych 2–0
 Jimmy Connors 2–0
 Mikhail Youzhny 2–0
 Daniel Vacek 2–0
 Tommy Robredo 2–0
 Radek Stepanek 2–0
 Derrick Rostagno 2–0
 Jonathan Stark 2–0
 Alberto Mancini 2–1
 Tim Mayotte 2–1
 Kevin Curren 2–1
 Nikolai Davydenko 2–1
 Paradorn Srichaphan 2–1
 Amos Mansdorf 2–1
 Scott Draper 2–1
 Feliciano Lopez 2–1
 Ivan Ljubicic 2–2
 John McEnroe 2–2
 Henri Leconte 2–2
 Hicham Arazi 2–2
 Tim Henman 2–2
 Juan-Carlos Ferrero 2–3
 Andrés Gómez 2–3
 Ivan Lendl 2–6
 Mario Ancic 1–0
 David Nalbandian 1–0
 Richard Gasquet 1–0
 Fernando Verdasco 1–0
 Julien Benneteau 1–0
 Florian Mayer 1–0
 Andrei Chesnokov 1–0
 Andrei Cherkasov 1–0
 Guillermo Cañas 1–0
 Joachim Johansson 1–0
 Marcos Baghdatis 1–0
 Ivo Karlovic 1–0
 Pat Cash 1–0
 Andrei Medvedev 1–1
 Mardy Fish 1–1
 Yannick Noah 1–1
 Marcelo Rios 1–2
 Jürgen Melzer 1–2
 Carl-Uwe Steeb 1–3
 Alexander Volkov 0–1
 Miloslav Mečíř 0–1
 David Ferrer 0–1
 Igor Andreev 0–1
 Fernando González 0–2
 Rafael Nadal 0–2

Top 10 wins

References 

Statistics
Agassi, Andre